Mattityahu "Matti" Peled (born Mattityahu Ifland on 20 July 1923, died 10 March 1995) was a well-known Israeli public figure who was at various periods of his life a professional military man who reached the rank of Aluf (Major General) in the IDF and was a member of the General Staff during the Six-Day War of 1967; a notable scholar who headed the Arabic Language and Literature Department of Tel Aviv University; a radical peace activist and a leading proponent of Israeli dialogue with the PLO and of complete withdrawal from the Occupied Territories in whose conquest he personally had a major role; and a member of the Knesset who often expressed controversial views considered "extreme left" in Israeli terms, yet was treated with considerable respect by staunch political people.

Early years
Peled was born in 1923 in Haifa, then the main port of the British Mandate of Palestine, and grew up in Jerusalem. Like many youth of that period, he was involved in one of the Socialist Zionist youth movements. At the age of 18 he joined the Palmach, the newly created Jewish paramilitary defense organization, as Palestine was becoming threatened by Rommel's rapid advance across North Africa. After Rommel's defeat in 1943 however, Peled was involved in various acts against the continuing British rule. He served in the Palmach's Jerusalem Platoon together with Yitzhak Rabin, with whom Peled was to maintain lifelong contact.

War of independence
In 1946 Peled started law studies in London, but the outbreak of civil war, following the Partition of Palestine brought him back to the military. With the ensuing 1948 Arab–Israeli War in May, he was among the cadre of militia officers who became the backbone of the newly founded Israeli Defence Forces, as the newly created state of Israel had to transform its collection of militias into a single, full-fledged, regular army, in the midst of heavy fighting on multiple fronts. With many still in their twenties, Peled and his fellow-officers were often entrusted with highly responsible positions, which in most armies are entrusted to older and far more experienced officers.

As the military commander of the Jerusalem region following the 1949 Armistice Agreements, Peled participated in a single project to resettle Palestinian refugees, in which a small group of villagers were allowed to cross the Green Line from the Jordanian-held West Bank back into Israel; this act was a marked exception to the government's policy of outright rejecting the return of Palestinian refugees. These refugees, however, were not allowed to return to their original village—Ein Neqova west of Jerusalem—but were resettled at a nearby location, the village of Ein Rafa.

Peled, an officer with wide-ranging intellectual interests, was marked early-on as a potential staff officer and in the early 1950s was sent to study at the British Staff and Command College, together with Rabin and others, who later held senior positions in the IDF over the following decades. During his stay in Britain, Peled met and befriended some Jordanian officers, who also had been sent there; some of these officers were to gain senior positions in their own, opposing military.

Military commander of Gaza
Peled served as the military commander of Gaza during the half-year Israeli occupation of the Gaza Strip, which followed and extended the Suez Crisis in 1956.

Though lasting only briefly, it was a crucial turning point in his life, as he was to recount on numerous later occasions; he found himself the "lord and master" over hundreds of thousands of Palestinians. While his daily decisions as governor profoundly affected their daily life, sometimes with life-and-death significance, he commanded without any personal knowledge of their language, and only the most vague idea of Palestinian culture and their way of life. This experience led to his decision to study Arabic, and the more general idea that Jews and Arabs who share a single small country should know each other's language. This conclusion, however, was not yet based on any particular political concept, and it was only many years later when he formulated his alternative political ideas that characterized his later career.

The "Generals' Protest" and the Six-Day War
During the severe political crisis of May 1967, in the lead-up to the Six-Day War, Peled—then at the rank of Aluf (Major General) and in charge of the IDF Supply Division—was considered a hawk. At the time when the government of PM Levi Eshkol seemed to be hesitating whether or not to launch a pre-emptive attack on the Egyptian armies concentrating in the Sinai, Peled was among a group of generals who demanded that the government start a war, and threatened to resign if it did not.

Others involved in this Generals' Protest (which only became known to the general public many years later) were then Major General Ariel Sharon and Major General Israel Tal. Sharon later became Defence Minister and Prime Minister and held positions then diametrically opposite Peled's. Tal, who later also became a dove, but a less radical one, never entered active politics.

Some historians credit the Generals' Protest with a decisive role in Israel's making the decision to launch the Six-Day War—a crucial turning point in the history of the country and of the entire Middle East to the present day. Others, however, assert that the Eshkol Government had already decided to go to war and that its apparent hesitation was mainly aimed at gaining international (and specifically, American) support.

When later asked about this incident—as he was on numerous occasions during his later career on the Left—Peled expressed no regret. He stated that having been in charge of the Supply Division, he was aware that prolonged mobilization, with the IDF reserves comprising a significant percentage of Israel's overall workforce, would severely cripple the country's economy, which was already suffering from a severe, years-long recession. Therefore, Peled asserted, he was duty-bound to tell the government that the country could not afford a long mobilization and that it had to strike "a sharp decisive blow," after which the reserves could be discharged—which is what Israel proceeded to do in the June 1967 Six-Day War.

Peled reiterated, however, that he had conceived of this as a purely military operation to counter a military threat, and that he had no idea that Israel would maintain occupation of the territories captured for decades afterwards, or establish settlements designed to effect their annexation and permanently change their demographic character. He had opposed these tendencies as soon as they appeared after the war.

Peled retired from military life in 1969. In that period he visited Vietnam as an official guest of the U.S. Army and was cordially received by American generals. At the time he still supported the U.S. involvement in the Vietnam War, a position that was to change in subsequent years.

Scholar and commentator
Peled had already studied Arabic literature during his military service, and soon after being discharged he completed and submitted to UCLA his Ph.D. thesis on the Egyptian Nobel Prize laureate Naguib Mahfouz. Subsequently, Peled was one of the founders of the Arabic Literature Department at Tel Aviv University, which he headed for several years, and soon gained a reputation as a serious and innovative scholar in his chosen field.

At the same time, he started regularly publishing articles in the weekend edition of Maariv, in which the clear leftward change in his political stance was evident. He also joined the Israeli Labor Party, though holding no office on its behalf, and in the 1973 elections was among a group of prominent doves who called upon voters to vote for Labor, despite its faults, rather than for the more radical small left-wing parties (which, under Israel's system of proportional representation had a good chance of gaining some seats in the Knesset).

Peled later reversed this position, becoming a leading member in several such left-wing parties in succession, and on numerous occasions expressing sharp criticism of Labor. Still, until his last day, he considered himself a Zionist, irrespective of the biting skepticism voiced by his political opponents on that point.

Peace activist
In 1975 Peled was one of the founders of the Israeli Council for Israeli-Palestinian Peace (ICIPP), together with Uri Avnery, Yaakov Arnon, Yossi Amitai, Amos Keinan, Aryeh Eliav and others. Aside from Avnery (a journalist and Knesset member who had confronted the Israeli establishment since the early 1950s) most founders of the ICIPP—like Peled himself—were dissident members of the establishment who had moved leftward in the early 1970s.

Arnon, for example, was a noted economist, who had headed the Zionist Federation of the Netherlands until 1948, when he came to Israel and became the director-general of its newly founded Ministry of Finance; later on he was chairman of the board of the Israeli Electricity Company. Eliav had been until shortly before the secretary-general of the Alignment, from which he resigned over the declaration of then-PM Golda Meir that "There is no Palestinian people".

The ICIPP Charter called for Israeli withdrawal from the territories occupied in 1967 and the creation of an independent Palestinian state in these territories, Jerusalem being shared between them. At the time this was considered a very radical plan, which the ICIPP was the first Zionist organization to support it. (Peled and several other ICIPP members won a libel suit against a columnist who had called them and their organization "anti-Zionist.")

The ICIPP sought to promote private and unofficial dialogue between Israelis and Palestinians in as many ways as possible, but also to try to bring about official negotiations between the Government of Israel and the leadership of the PLO.

As the chief coordinator of the ICIPP, Peled took a leading role in the initially clandestine meetings with PLO leaders. The first meeting in Paris in 1976 brought Peled and several other Israelis together with PLO senior official Issam Sartawi, who acted with the full authorisation of Yasser Arafat—though Arafat personally would become involved in such dialogue only during the siege of Beirut in the First Lebanon War in 1982. The very holding of this dialogue represented a significant step from the PLO's side; until then, the organization had the official policy of "talking only to anti-Zionist Israelis;" i.e., only to a small handful among the Israeli Jewish population.

Sartawi was assassinated in 1983 by an extremist Palestinian group, as was Sa'id Hamami, another Palestinian participant in the dialogue. Also assassinated was Henri Curiel, an Egyptian Jewish communist living in exile in Paris, who had played a key role in facilitating the opening of Israeli-Palestinian contacts. Curiel's assassination in 1978 remains a mystery, with the French police never finding (and according to some of his friends, never making a real effort to find) the killer(s).

The Israeli participants were spared such tragedies, though there were many death threats, and some newspaper columnists explicitly accused them of "treason." The PLO was then considered to be arch-terrorists and murderers, and few Israelis could comprehend the idea of talking to them.

Peled did approach his old comrade in arms Yitzhak Rabin, then on his first term as Prime Minister of Israel (1974–77). He offered to brief Rabin on his talks with the Palestinians, and Rabin consented. On several occasions, indeed, Sartawi and other Palestinian interlocutors used this channel to pass on specific messages intended for Rabin's ears. The PM patiently heard him out, but never consented to send a message in return. "That would be negotiating with the PLO, and I will never never do that" he told Peled—ironic words in retrospect, as Rabin was later to conduct intensive talks with the PLO and sign the Oslo Agreement with Arafat. Peled always believed that Oslo was at least in part a late flowering of the seeds he and his friends had sown in the 1970s.

Founding the Left Camp of Israel
Peled's first direct involvement in a political party was in 1977 with the foundation of the short-lived Left Camp of Israel party, whose platform focused on advocating peace negotiations with the Palestinians. Peled, like virtually the entire membership of the ICIPP went into the new party as a matter of course, but things did not go as smoothly as may have been expected.

While all members of the party were doves as far as the Israeli general political spectrum was concerned, there were considerable difference of political strategy and tactics. One faction, headed by Ran Cohen—later a Knesset Member and cabinet minister for the Meretz party—held that Israeli peaceniks talking to the Palestinians should strive to extract concessions from them, such as an official recognition of Israel.

On the other hand, Peled—member of the Left Camp of Israel Executive for the whole of the party's six years of existence, though he never held a public office on its behalf—claimed that the Palestinian leadership, representing its entire people, could not be expected to make in a dialogue with radical Israeli dissidents the kind of concessions that would undermine its negotiating position if and when it came to negotiate with the Government of Israel. (Which, with Menachem Begin as Israel's PM at the time, and Ariel Sharon as Defence Minister, seemed a very distant possibility). In effect, the ICIPP—with Peled and Avnery at its head—became a faction within the Left Camp of Israel, embroiled in constant internecine struggle with the opposing faction.

Things came to a head with the outbreak of the First Lebanon War in 1982. Peled outspokenly supported the reserve soldiers who refused to take part in the war, organised by the newly founded Yesh Gvul movement—some 200 of whom served terms in the military prisons. Peled's position in support of the refusers drew much public attention due to Peled's illustrious military past. Ran Cohen, himself a reserve Colonel (Aluf-Misheh) strongly objected, stating that it was a soldier's duty to obey orders, even when he politically objects to the war being conducted; and indeed, Cohen himself, as an artillery officer, took part in the bombardment of Beirut.

Avnery, Peled's partner, arrived in Beirut in quite different circumstances—crossing the lines to conduct a first-ever meeting with PLO leader Yasser Arafat, at his besieged and bombarded headquarters. Cohen strongly condemned the meeting, which he characterised as "fawning". Thereupon Peled, always known as a forthright speaker, accused Cohen of being "a war criminal who bombards a civilian population".

This precipitated a final split and break-up of the party. Cohen and his followers decisively parted ways with Peled and Avnery, and joined with Shulamit Aloni and other factions to form the Meretz party.

Knesset Member in the Progressive List for Peace
For their part, Peled and Avnery were in 1984 among the founding members of a Jewish-Arab political party, the Progressive List for Peace. Their Arab partners were headed by Mohammed Miari, a veteran radical political activist and human rights lawyer specializing in land confiscation cases, and Rev. Riach Abu-el-Assal, Vicar of the Anglican Church in Nazareth (later Anglican Bishop of Jerusalem).

Several attempts were made by the government and right-wing parties to outlaw the PLP and prevent it from running in elections—which was the fate of earlier parties in which Miari was involved, such as Al Ard in 1965. However, the Supreme Court overturned these attempts.

Thus, in the elections of that year Miari and Peled were elected to the Knesset. Peled's parliamentary term coincided with the tense atmosphere of the outbreak of the First Intifada. However, he was far from confining himself to the hotly controversial issues of the Israeli-Palestinian conflict, taking great interest in a great spectrum of subjects, on some of which he found common ground with staunch right-wingers.

He soon gained a reputation as one of the most serious and industrious of Israel's parliamentarians, whose speeches on the Knesset floor "resembled academic lectures". Reportedly, he was capable of reading up for a whole week to prepare a ten-minute speech on an obscure subject. To the despair of the party's press spokespersons, he utterly refused to make any "gimmicks" to catch the attention of the press, or include any "soundbite" in his parliamentary speeches. He lost his seat in the 1988 elections when the party was reduced to one seat.

Final years
Peled dedicated his last years to advancing a dialogue of mutual recognition and respect between Israelis and Palestinians, and to research of Arabic literature. He was the first Israeli professor of Arabic literature who introduced studies of Palestinian literature into the academic curriculum.

Peled published numerous political articles in Israeli and international media and translated several pieces of Arabic literature to Hebrew. For what turned out to be his last work of translation—"The Sages of Darkness" by the Syrian-Kurdish writer Salim Barakat—Peled won the Translators' Association Prize.

In 1993, he took part in forming Gush Shalom, the Israeli Peace Bloc—a grassroots peace movement in whose ranks Peled alternately expressed a sharp criticism of his old friend Rabin for severe human rights violations in the occupied territories; warmly commended and congratulated him for his dramatic rapprochement with the PLO and the handshake with Arafat on the White House lawn; and finally expressed a growing worry and anxiety at the slow pace of the peace process and the continuing occupation, oppression and settlement activity—which gave ample opportunity, as Peled wrote in several admonitory articles, to extremists on both sides to create a renewed dynamic of escalation.

In 1994, seventy years of robust health were broken when Peled felt sharp pains that turned out to be the sign of an incurable liver cancer. Virtually until his last day he followed political developments and continued to write political essays even when the very act of sitting at his word processor became extremely difficult and painful.

His last essay, written a few weeks before his death and published in The Other Israel, the ICIPP's newsletter, was entitled "Requiem to Oslo"—an article expressing disappointment with the Oslo Accords and predicting the explosion that was to break out with the Second Intifada of 2000.

Peled's funeral brought together a unique combination of radical peace activists with former generals and senior officers. At the graveside, messages of condolences were read from both the government of Israel and PLO Chairman Arafat. After his death, his widow Zika Peled contributed Matti's private library to the Arab Teachers' College at Beit Berl. His political articles were contributed to the Lavon Institute.

Peled was married and had two sons and two daughters. One daughter, Nurit Peled-Elhanan, is a professor of language and education at the Hebrew University of Jerusalem. She lost her 14-year-old daughter Smadar Elhanan in the 1997 Ben Yehuda Street suicide bombing, in the center of Jerusalem. One son, Miko Peled, is also a peace activist and lives in San Diego.

See also
 List of peace activists

References

External links
Matti Peled Foundation for Peace in the Middle East

Commemorative articles published in "The Other Israel" after Matti Peled's death

1923 births
1995 deaths
Israeli generals
Members of the 11th Knesset (1984–1988)
Academic staff of Tel Aviv University
Israeli–Palestinian peace process
20th-century Israeli Jews
Israeli anti-war activists
Palmach members
People from Haifa
Jewish peace activists
Jewish socialists
Progressive List for Peace politicians